Cut-leaf crabapple is a common name for several plants and may refer to:

Malus toringoides
Malus transitoria, native to China